James Russell Garth (1 May 1922 – 1 June 1972) was a Scottish footballer who played for Drumchapel Amateurs, Greenock Morton, Preston North End, Clyde, Raith Rovers and Inverness Caledonian.

Garth died in Detroit, Michigan on 1 June 1972, at the age of 50.

References

External links
 

1922 births
1972 deaths
Scottish footballers
English Football League players
Drumchapel Amateur F.C. players
Greenock Morton F.C. players
Preston North End F.C. players
Clyde F.C. players
Raith Rovers F.C. players
Scottish Football League players
Caledonian F.C. players
Association football forwards
People from Bridgeton, Glasgow
Footballers from Glasgow